Barco Strike was a vector-based drawing program targeted at the repro and print shop markets. It was developed by the Graphics division of the Barco Group from 1993 to the late 1990s on both Barco's own proprietary workstations and SGI computers. It was meant both as a replacement for the proprietary Aesthedes systems, and as a companion linework product to the Creator continuous tone software.

Software modules

Like Barco Creator, Strike was set up as a modular system. The base was the "LW-Brix" linework software library (unlimited zoom, unlimited undo/redo, spline data, editable text, transparency etc.).

File formats

Strike could import PostScript data and convert this to the custom Barco format. It was also possible for Strike to use the optional PS-Outline software to output files in Adobe Illustrator format.

Hardware

Strike! ran on the proprietary Barco BG-2000 workstation, as well as the SGI Indigo, Indy and Crimson workstations.

Release history

Availability
Barco Strike was discontinued in the late 1990s, and was not picked up by Purup-Eskofot after it purchased the Graphics division of Barco. Demo versions of both Barco Strike and Creator are available on the SGI Hot Mix 7 promotional CD-ROM.

See also
Barco ColorTone
Barco Creator
Barco Graphics software
Vector graphics editors
IRIX software
Technical communication tools